False Identity is a 1990 American film directed by James Keach. It stars Stacy Keach and Geneviève Bujold.

Plot summary
When Rachel, a radio personality, discovers a Purple Heart at a garage sale she decides to find out its history. She finds that the medal belonged to a man named Harlan Erickson, a long-lost brother of the town's leading citizen.

Cast
Stacy Keach - Ben Driscoll/Harlan Errickson
Geneviève Bujold - Rachel Roux
Tobin Bell - Marshall Errickson
Veronica Cartwright - Vera Errickson
Mimi Maynard - Audrey
Michael Champion - Luther
Todd Jeffries - Chad Erickson
Anne Bloom - Elise
Grainger Hines - Tommy
Tom McFadden - Sheriff (as Thom McFadden)
William Lucking - Frank Calovich
Renee O'Connor - Angela Errickson
Stacy Keach Sr. - Irving Campbell
Robert Fredrickson - Ralph Murphy
Kimberly Beck - Cindy Roger
Pat Crawford Brown (as Pat Crawford) - Nellie

References

External links

1990 films
Films directed by James Keach
American crime thriller films
RKO Pictures films
1990 directorial debut films
Films scored by Barry Goldberg
1990s English-language films
1990s American films